Edward Grant (born Isaac Blank; 9 July 1913 – 20 July 2006) was a South African Trotskyist who spent most of his adult life in Britain. He was a founding member of the group Militant and later Socialist Appeal.

Early life
Grant's father had settled in South Africa after fleeing Tsarist Russia in the 19th century. His original family name is reported as "Blank" also in his autobiography, but The Guardian in an obituary suggested that his full birth name was kept unknown.

His parents divorced when he was young and he was brought up by his French-born mother who took in lodgers to supplement her income. He was introduced to Trotskyism by one of these lodgers, Ralph Lee (born Raphael Levy), who discussed politics with Isaac and supplied him with copies of The Militant, the Trotskyist newspaper of the Communist League of America. In 1934, he helped Lee found the Bolshevik-Leninist League of South Africa, a small Trotskyist group which soon merged with other tendencies to form the Workers Party of South Africa. Later in the year, Grant, Lee and Max Basch decided to move to London where they believed there were better prospects for the movement.

On the journey he changed his name to Edward Grant – but he was always to be known as Ted – and stopped over in France to meet Trotsky's son, Lev Sedov. Once in Britain, he joined the Marxist Group, which at the time was working in the Independent Labour Party and took part in the Battle of Cable Street against fascists. But when Trotsky suggested the group should turn to working in the Labour Party, and their leadership disagreed, Grant was one of a small group who split to form the Bolshevik-Leninist Group, which soon became known as the Militant Group. The group grew, but in 1937, a dispute about the leadership's treatment of Ralph Lee led to the split of several members including Grant.

Political activities
The former Militant Group members formed the Workers' International League, and Grant was to become its main theoretician after the return of Lee to South Africa and in partnership with Jock Haston. The group grew, and in 1941, he became editor of its paper. He continued his role in the fused Revolutionary Communist Party. In 1945, Ted Grant, together with Jock Haston and others, argued that there would be a new but limited period of economic expansion of the 1950s and 1960s in the west. This contrasted with the perspectives of the American Socialist Workers Party led by James Cannon in 1945.

Following  the breakup of the RCP, Grant reluctantly joined Gerry Healy's faction, but was soon expelled. He formed a new, small tendency in the Labour Party which, during 1952 and 1953, called itself the International Socialist Group after its quarterly magazine, The International Socialist. Later named the Revolutionary Socialist League, it was recognised as the official British section of the Fourth International between 1957 and 1965. In 1964 it founded the newspaper Militant.

The group at first grew only very slowly, but by 1983 it had become a significant force in British politics, known as Militant, or the Militant tendency. Throughout this period, Grant and his colleagues formally denied to officials of the Labour Party that Militant was organised in a way which was contrary to the constitution of the Labour Party, insisting it was merely a group of supporters of the Militant newspaper. In the atmosphere of Labour's shift to the left in the 1970s, in which constituency Labour Party General Management Committees (GMCs) were largely against expulsions, there were only a few isolated attempts to take action against Militant, while its support in the party, judged by the number of delegates to national conference who supported its motions, seemed to grow.

Labour Party responses
The left had lost their majority on the Labour Party's National Executive Committee in 1982, and the five members of the editorial board of the Militant newspaper, Grant, Clare Doyle, Peter Taaffe, Lynn Walsh and Keith Dickinson, were expelled from the party on 22 February 1983, while Michael Foot was still leader.

The decision was subsequently endorsed by the full conference of the party, where the union block vote (often used at the discretion of the union general secretaries) swung behind the expulsions, while 80% of the delegates from the Constituency Labour Parties were against expelling Militant activists, as were a considerable number of trade union delegates. This measure did not however stop the growth of Militant.

In 1986 the Labour Party comprehensively overhauled its rule book, at the same time as expelling leading Militant members in Merseyside, with a view to making it possible to systematically remove members of entryist groups such as Militant. At first only a handful of leading Militant members were expelled; their (by 1987) three Labour-elected members of parliament were remained under the Labour whip in the House of Commons.

The expulsions from the Labour Party later resumed, by Militant's own tabulation amounting to 219 by August 1991, created a dynamic within the organisation that led many to question the use of entryist tactics.

Expulsion from Militant

At the end of the 1980s, Militant was active in the anti-Poll Tax movement against the Thatcher government's Community Charge (popularly known as the poll tax). Meanwhile, there was a growing faction which believed that continuing support for the Labour Party was impeding the growth of the tendency. Grant worried that his organisation was shifting away from interpreting Trotsky's theories and indulging in "activism"; he had argued that Militant's MPs should pay the poll tax to protect the group. A debate arose within Militant: Peter Taaffe and his supporters argued in favour of abandoning the entryist tactic, and instead began standing candidates against the Labour Party, first in the 1991 Liverpool Walton by-election and then in the 1992 general election in Liverpool and Scotland. Ted Grant opposed these developments and, after a special national conference confirmed the decision to leave the Labour Party, Grant was expelled from Militant along with Alan Woods in 1992.

Following their expulsion Grant and Woods started a new group inside the Labour Party known by the name of its publication Socialist Appeal. The split also left Grant and his supporters outside the Committee for a Workers' International (CWI), but he and Woods were able to found the Committee for a Marxist International (now called the International Marxist Tendency) with international supporters. Grant now spent much of his time  writing until he suffered a stroke in September 2003, at the age of 90, while he was giving a speech. He died on 20 July 2006, at the age of 93.

Trotsky's grandson Vsievolod Platonovich Volkov said in 1997 that Grant's "deep knowledge of Marxist theory, and particularly the thoughts and works of Leon Trotsky, leap from the written page. Such a knowledge is the fruit of a long life tenaciously dedicated to the meticulous study of Marxism both in theory and in everyday practice."

Views

Main ideas
Ted Grant described himself as a Marxist, a Leninist and a Trotskyist. In his ideas, one can recognise a strong emphasis on the following issues:

 So-called "Socialist" states born after the Second World War are defined by Grant as "deformed workers' states", i.e. "proletarian Bonapartist" regimes. Thus he denies a qualitative difference between Stalin's USSR and such countries. In particular, Grant attempted to work up from Trotsky's theory of the Soviet Union as a degenerated workers' state. Grant foresaw the likelihood, in the 1945–1991 world situation, of the establishment of new bureaucratised "workers' states" in backward countries, also on the basis of left-wing military coups and peasant guerrilla wars. According to Grant, variants between such regimes have a minor importance and the clashes counterposing their leaderships are just instrumental in supporting the interests of conflicting bureaucracies. Differently from most Trotskyist groups, Ted Grant believed that also Burma and Syria, though their leaders were not delivering Communistic speeches, were to be included in that same category when they had a planned economy. For all these countries, he supported a classic Trotsky's demand: a workers' "political revolution" aimed at restoring or establishing "workers' democracy" while preserving economic planning, as asked by the workers' wing of the Hungarian Revolution of 1956.
 Heavily stressed was the importance of the "united front" tactics worked out by the Third International in the 1920s and a renewed version of the entrist tactics which Trotsky advised some of his followers to adopt in the 1930s. According to Grant, Trotskyist groups joining large left-wing parties and the most important unions was a practical implementation of the united front in those difficult conditions Trotskyists had to face after 1945, when the Fourth International was far from being a gathering banner for most workers and leftist youth. In particular since the late 1950s, Ted Grant developed an original concept of entrism (which he described as being a different concept than the classic entryism and also an opposing vision to Michel Pablo's "deep entrism" or "entrism sui generis"): the revolutionists should have worked "inside, outside and around the mass organisations" for "workers begin to move through their own traditional mass organisations" and therefore "outside the workers' movement, there's nothing". This stance resulted in the Grantist groups on a world scale leaving the Fourth International after 1965, since Grant considered other Fourth Internationalists as having degenerated into sects under the influence of the ideas of the petty bourgeoisie (guerrillaism, left-wing nationalism, studentism, third-worldism, feminism, etc.).

Opposition to the partition of India
Ted Grant heavily criticized the partition of India, writing in the foreword of fellow Marxist Lal Khan's "Crisis in the Indian Subcontinent, Partition: Can it be Undone?":

Works
 Ted Grant's collected works are in the process of being published by Wellred Books; so far, the first two volumes have come out, covering the periods 1938–1942 and 1943–1945.

References

Further reading
Grant, T. (1989). The Unbroken Thread. London: Fortress Books
Christophe Le Dréau, « Repères pour une histoire du trotskisme britannique, 1925–2005 », Communisme, 2006, 87, numéro spécial « Regards sur le communisme britannique », pp. 149–160.
Woods, Alan (2014). The Permanent Revolutionary. London: Wellred Publications

External links

Obituary by his close collaborator Alan Woods.
Obituary from The Socialist.
Obituary from Revolutionary History.
Obituary and critical analysis of Grant's life and thought from the World Socialist Web Site.
Part Two from the World Socialist Web Site.
Obituary by Ian Birchall from Socialist Worker.
Obituary from The Guardian.
Obituary from The Independent.
Obituary from The Daily Telegraph.
Obituary from Socialist Democracy.
Works of Ted Grant on the Marxists Internet Archive.

1913 births
2006 deaths
British Trotskyists
International Marxist Tendency
Jewish socialists
Marxist theorists
Marxist writers
Militant tendency supporters
People from Germiston
Political party founders
Revolutionary Communist Party (UK, 1944) members
South African Jews
South African people of Russian-Jewish descent
South African Trotskyists
South African political party founders